The discography of German electronic band Kraftwerk consists of 10 studio albums, two live albums, one remix album and 26 singles. Formed by Ralf Hütter and Florian Schneider in Düsseldorf in 1970, Kraftwerk were part of the krautrock scene. However, the group mostly found fame as pioneers of electronic music, showcasing their styles on a series of concept albums.

While their initial albums featured mostly German lyrics, in 1975 Kraftwerk began writing lyrics that combined both German and English verses. Beginning with "Trans-Europe Express" (1977), most songs by the group were created as duplicate versions sung in English or German; some French, Japanese, Italian or Spanish versions were made.

Since the mid-1970s Kraftwerk have always picked at least two album tracks for release as singles. These accompanying singles were, for many years, created by simply editing down the album recordings, rather than being remixed or otherwise expanded. Since 1991 Kraftwerk have tended to follow the trend for releasing singles in multiple remixed arrangements. A small number of recordings have only been issued as albumless singles, notably those between 1999 and 2000 for the Expo 2000 project.

Prior to forming Kraftwerk, Hütter and Schneider were part of a project called Organisation that released the album Tone Float in 1969.

Studio albums

Live albums

Compilation albums

Box sets

Singles

Video albums 
 2005: Minimum-Maximum

Music videos 
Note that the list might be incomplete.

References

External links 
 Kraftwerk Official Homepage
 AllKraftwerk
 

Discography
Discographies of German artists
Electronic music discographies